Vila Nova do Ceira is a Portuguese parish in the municipality of Góis. The population in 2011 was 929, in an area of 19.70 km².

References

Freguesias of Góis